Shameless is a 2012 Polish drama film directed by Filip Marczewski.

Cast 
 Mateusz Kościukiewicz - Tadek
 Agnieszka Grochowska - Anka
 Anna Próchniak - Irmina
  - Andrzej
  - Member of Parliament

References

External links 

2012 drama films
2012 films
Incest in film
Films about siblings
Polish drama films